In Greek mythology, Camarina (Ancient Greek: Καμαρινα Kamarina) was an Oceanid, as a daughter of the Titan of the Sea, Oceanus, possibly by his sister-wife Tethys. She was the eponym of the city of Kamarina in Sicily.

Notes

References 

 Pindar, Odes translated by Diane Arnson Svarlien. 1990. Online version at the Perseus Digital Library.
 Pindar, The Odes of Pindar including the Principal Fragments with an Introduction and an English Translation by Sir John Sandys, Litt.D., FBA. Cambridge, MA., Harvard University Press; London, William Heinemann Ltd. 1937. Greek text available at the Perseus Digital Library.

Oceanids
Greek goddesses